Emporio (formerly: Unileverhaus) is a 98 m high-rise office building in the Neustadt of Hamburg. Originally built in 1964 as headquarters of Deutsche Unilever, when Unilever moved its headquarters to HafenCity in 2009, the tower was sold, renamed, extensively renovated and since marketed to multiple parties.

Emporio was designed by Helmut Hentrich & Hubert Petschnigg of Düsseldorf and had originally 21 floors at a total height of 90 m. The renovation carried out until 2012 included an additional three floors and a number of state-of-the-art technical and ecological modernizations; among others a double glazed façade and low energy consuming HVAC. Part of the redevelopment is a newly built, six-story street-block, rented to Swedish hotel chain Scandic Hotels.

See also 
 List of tallest buildings in Hamburg
 List of tallest buildings in Germany

References

External links 

 official site 
  
 

Skyscrapers in Hamburg
Buildings and structures in Hamburg-Mitte
Office buildings completed in 1964
Skyscraper office buildings in Germany